Striae atrophicans are a cutaneous condition characterized by usually multiple, symmetric, well-defined linear atrophic lesions that often follow the lines of cleavage.

See also 
 Striae distensae
 List of cutaneous conditions

References 

Abnormalities of dermal fibrous and elastic tissue